Go Soo-hee (born July 18, 1976) is a South Korean actress.

Filmography

Film

Television series

Variety show

References

External links
 
 
 
 고수희 at Naver 
 고수희 at Cine 21 

1976 births
Living people
People from Daegu
South Korean film actresses
South Korean television actresses
South Korean stage actresses
20th-century South Korean actresses
21st-century South Korean actresses
Anyang Arts High School alumni
Daejin University alumni
Place of birth missing (living people)